Ma'at or Maat is an Egyptian goddess and concept.

Maat or MAAT may also refer to:
 Maat (TV series), Hum TV drama serial
 Maat (rank), naval rank of the German Navy, Kriegsmarine, and Kaiserliche Marine
 MAAT (climatology), Mean Annual Air Temperature
 Member of the Association of Accounting Technicians
 Maat Kheru, the true intonation with which the dead must recite magical incantations according to Maspus
 Maat Mons, the highest volcano on the planet Venus

Culture
 Museum of Art, Architecture and Technology, also known as MAAT, (former Electricity Museum), Lisbon, Portugal

People
 Albert Jan Maat, Dutch politician and member of the European Parliament
 Martin de Maat, teacher and artistic director at the Second City in Chicago

See also
 Mat (disambiguation)
 MAT (disambiguation)
 Matt (disambiguation)
 Matte (disambiguation)
 Matthew (name)